Attirampakkam or Athirampakkam is a village located 60 kilometers away from Chennai, Tamil Nadu, India. The oldest known stone tools in India were discovered near the village, which became the type site for the Madrasian culture.

Discovery and dating of artifacts 
Robert Bruce Foote and his colleague William King of the East India Company's Geological Survey found the first primitive stone tools at Attirampakkam in the early 1863. Later, more stone tools were recovered from Attirampakkam over a 20-year period by archaeologists from the Sharma Centre for Heritage Education in India and other Indian institutions. Due to the paucity of any hominine fossils or bones recovered yet from the site or from South Asia as a whole, it is currently not possible to conclude which hominin species had created these tools.

By performing a luminescence dating method called post-Infrared-Stimulated Luminescence (pIR-IRSL) on about 7,200 artifacts found at Attirampakkam, researchers have made a chronology of Attirampakkam stone tool technology with a span of about 200,000 years. Latest studies indicate that the Levallois technology used at Attirampakkam emerged at about 385,000 (± 64,000) years ago, at a time period when processes signifying the end of the Acheulian culture occurred and a Middle Palaeolithic culture had emerged.

See also 
 Acheulean industry
 Madrasian culture
 Jwalapuram
 South Asian Stone Age

References

Paleolithic
Archaeology of India
History of Tamil Nadu
Archaeological sites in Tamil Nadu
Ancient Tamil Nadu
Tamilakam